Catherine Samie (born 3 February 1933) is a French actress and member (sociétaire, doyen) of the Comédie-Française from 1962. On 14 July 2011 she became Grand Officier of the Legion of Honor. She is a Catholic.

Filmography

References

External links

 

1933 births
Living people
French film actresses
French stage actresses
Sociétaires of the Comédie-Française
Grand Officiers of the Légion d'honneur
Officers of the Ordre national du Mérite
French Roman Catholics
French National Academy of Dramatic Arts alumni
Administrators of the Comédie-Française
20th-century French actresses
21st-century French actresses